Emathis is a genus of the spider family Salticidae (jumping spiders) with ten described species. Half of the species occurs from Sumatra to the Philippines, the other five occur in the West Indies. It is not certain that these two groups should reside within the same genus. This genus is very similar to the closely related Lepidemathis, which are larger.

Species
 Emathis astorgasensis Barrion & Litsinger, 1995 – Philippines
 Emathis coprea (Thorell, 1890) – Sumatra
 Emathis luteopunctata Petrunkevitch, 1930 – Puerto Rico
 Emathis makilingensis Barrion & Litsinger, 1995 – Philippines
 Emathis minuta Petrunkevitch, 1930 – Puerto Rico
 Emathis portoricensis Petrunkevitch, 1930 – Puerto Rico
 Emathis scabra (Thorell, 1890) – Sumatra
 Emathis tetuani Petrunkevitch, 1930 – Puerto Rico
 Emathis unispina Franganillo, 1930 – Cuba
 Emathis weyersi Simon, 1899 – Sumatra to Philippines

Footnotes

References
  (2000): An Introduction to the Spiders of South East Asia. Malaysian Nature Society, Kuala Lumpur.
  (2007): The world spider catalog, version 8.0. American Museum of Natural History.

Salticidae
Salticidae genera
Spiders of Asia
Spiders of the Caribbean